"Til the End of Time" is a song by American Christian musician Cody Carnes featuring Kari Jobe. The song was released on June 16, 2017, as the third single from his debut studio album, The Darker the Night / The Brighter the Morning (2017). Carnes co-wrote the song with Lauren Strahm and Robert Marvin. Jeremy Lutito produced the single.

"Til the End of Time" peaked at No. 50 on the US Hot Christian Songs chart.

Background
Cody Carnes released "Til the End of the Time" featuring Kari Jobe as the third single from his debut studio album, The Darker the Night / The Brighter the Morning (2017). The song followed the release of singles "The Cross Has the Final Word" and "Hold It All."

Composition

Critical reception
Jonathan Andre of 365 Days of Inspiring Media in gave a positive review of the song, comparing the song to "History Maker" by Delirious?, and describing the song as Carnes "Fusing together worship with electronic dance music (as with a lot of his music)... everything is on point—the vocals, singing, the collaboration together as well as the music."

Commercial performance
"Til the End of Time" debuted at No. 50 on the US Hot Christian Songs chart dated July 8, 2017.

Music videos
The lyric video of "Til the End of Time" was published on June 16, 2017, on Cody Carnes' YouTube channel. Cody Carnes released the official music video of "Til the End of Time" on June 30, 2017, on YouTube. Cody Carnes released the acoustic performance video of "Til the End of Time" on June 30, 2017, on YouTube. The live performance video of the song, performed by Cody Carnes and Kari Jobe, was published on October 27, 2017, on Cody Carnes' YouTube channel.

Charts

Release history

References

External links
 

2017 singles
2017 songs
Contemporary Christian songs
Kari Jobe songs
Cody Carnes songs
Songs written by Cody Carnes